Lewes Football Club is a semi-professional football club based in Lewes, East Sussex, England.

History

The club was established in a meeting at the Royal Oak pub on 23 September 1885. In 1896 they were founder members of the East Sussex League. The club finished bottom of the league in 1898–99 and again the following season. The league was expanded to two divisions in 1899, with Lewes placed in the Senior Division, going on to finish last for a third consecutive season. After finishing bottom of the Senior Division again in 1900–01 without winning a match, the club left the league. They later joined the Mid-Sussex League, entering its Senior Division in 1905. The club were Senior Division runners-up in 1907–08 and again in 1909–10 before winning the league in 1910–11.

Lewes then left the Mid-Sussex League for a reformed East Sussex League, and were runners-up in 1912–13. Although they finished bottom of the East Sussex League the following season, the club also played in the Mid-Sussex League and won the league title. After World War I they spent the 1919–20 season in the Brighton, Hove & District League. In 1920 they were founder members of the Sussex County League. The club were runners-up in 1924–25 and again in 1933–34 and 1958–59, also winning the League Cup in 1938–39.

After finishing as runners-up in 1963–64, Lewes won the Sussex County League title the following season and moved up to Division Two of the Athenian League. They were Division Two champions in 1967–68, earning promotion to Division One. After a third-place finish in their first season in Division One, the club won the division the following season (on goal average) and were promoted to the Premier Division. In 1977 they transferred to Division Two of the Isthmian League, in which they finished as runners-up in 1979–80 to earn promotion to Division One.

Lewes remained in Division One of the Isthmian League until being relegated to Division Two at the end of the 1990–91 season. Although they were promoted back to Division One the following season after finishing as runners-up in Division Two, they were relegated again in 1992–93 and again in 1993–94, dropping into Division Three. The club were Division Three runners-up in 2000–01 and were promoted to Division Two. The following season saw the club reach the first round of the FA Cup for the first time; drawn at home to Stoke City, the match was moved to the Britannia Stadium with Stoke winning 2–0. The club finished the season by winning the Division Two title to secure promotion to Division One South;

After winning the Division One South title in 2003–04, Lewes entered a series of play-offs for promotion to the newly formed Conference South; they defeated Yeading 1–0, Basingstoke Town 4–1 and Kingstonian 1–0 to earn a place in the new sixth tier division. Although the club finished fourth in the Conference South in its inaugural season, they were prevented from taking part in the promotion play-offs as the Dripping Pan did not meet the standards required for the Conference National. Another fourth-place finish in 2005–06 saw the club again denied the opportunity to participate in the play-offs.

In 2006–07 Lewes reached the first round of the FA Cup again, losing 4–1 at home to Darlington. The following season saw another first round appearance, ending in a 3–0 defeat at Mansfield Town. After winning the Conference South title at the end of the season, the club were promoted to the Conference National, having carried out works on the Dripping Pan. However, after winning the title, manager Steve King and all-but-one of the first team squad left the club. The following season saw them finish bottom of the Conference National, resulting in relegation back to the Conference South. In 2010 the club was bought for £1 by six fans and turned into a community-owned initiative.

In 2010–11 Lewes were relegated to the Premier Division of the Isthmian League, where they played until being relegated to Division One South at the end of the 2015–16 season. In July 2017 the club became the first professional or semi-professional football club to pay its women's team the same as its men's team. They were Division One South runners-up in 2017–18, earning promotion back to the Premier Division.

Stadium

The club have played at the Dripping Pan since their formation, although they temporarily relocated to the Convent Field adjacent to the Dripping Pan for the two seasons immediately before World War I.

Current squad

Club officials
Manager: Tony Russell
Assistant manager: Joe Vines
First Team Coaches: Nathan White, Grant Hall
U18s Manager: Dale Hurley
Chair: Stuart Fuller
Board members: Ed Briggs, Scott Currie, Andy Gowland, Stuart Fuller, Lucy Mills John Peel, Sally Taplin, Trevor Wells
Non-Executive Director: Willa Bailey, Tim Bradshaw
Club secretary: John Peel
Club president: Terry Parris

Honours
Conference South
Champions 2007–08
Isthmian League
Division One South champions 2003–04
Division Two champions 2001–02
Athenian League
Division 1 champions 1969–70
Division 2 champions 1967–68
Sussex County League
Champions 1964–65
League Cup winners 1938–39
Mid-Sussex League
Champions 1910–11, 1913–14
Montgomery Cup winners 1908–09, 1910–11
Sussex Senior Challenge Cup
Winners 1964–65, 1970–71, 1984–85, 2000–01, 2005–06
Sussex RUR Cup
Winners 1961–62, 1962–63, 1964–65
Sussex Floodlight Cup
Winners 1976–77
Supporters Direct Shield
Winners 2012–13

Records
Best FA Cup performance: First round, 2001–02, 2006–07, 2007–08
Best FA Trophy performance: Third round, 2002–03, 2003–04
Best FA Vase performance: Quarter-finals, 2001–02
Record attendance: 2,500 vs Newhaven, Sussex County League, 26 December 1947
Most appearances: Terry Parris, 662
Most goals: Pip Parris, 350
Record transfer fee paid: £2,000 for Matt Allen

See also
Lewes F.C. players
Lewes F.C. managers
Lewes F.C. Women
Football in Sussex

References

External links

Official website

 
Football clubs in England
Football clubs in East Sussex
Fan-owned football clubs in England
Association football clubs established in 1885
1885 establishments in England
Lewes
East Sussex Football League
Mid-Sussex Football League
Brighton, Hove & District Football League
Southern Combination Football League
Athenian League
Isthmian League
National League (English football) clubs